Heikinheimo is a Finnish-language surname that may refer to:

 Aarne Heikinheimo (1894–1938), Finnish Major General.
 Eva Heikinheimo (surname Heikel until 1906; 1879–1955), Finnish educator and politician.

 Harras Heikinheimo (1914–1999), Finnish chess player.
 Seppo Heikinheimo (1938–1997), Finnish music journalist, musicologist, translator and writer.
 Vesa Heikinheimo (born 1983), Finnish footballer.

See also 

 Heikel – name from which Heikinheimo was fennicized

Finnish-language surnames